Sohan Singh Thandal is an Indian politician and government minister from the state of Punjab.

Constituency
Thandal represents the Chabbewal Assembly Constituency of Punjab.

Political Party 
Thandal is a member of Shiromani Akali Dal.

Controversy
Thandal was convicted in a criminal misconduct, corruption, and disproportionate assets case, but was later acquitted by a higher court.

External links
 Council of Ministers Government of Punjab

References 

People from Punjab, India
Shiromani Akali Dal politicians
Living people
Year of birth missing (living people)